Fintown Railway station served the village of Fintown in County Donegal, Ireland.

The station opened on 3 June 1903 on the Donegal Railway Company line from Glenties to Stranorlar. It closed on 15 December 1947 when the County Donegal Railways Joint Committee closed the line from Glenties to Stranorlar in an effort to save money. Freight services on the route continued until 10 March 1952. 

The station re-opened on 3 June 1995 to serve the newly formed  narrow gauge Fintown Railway along a former route used by the County Donegal Railways Joint Committee. The railway runs from Fintown towards Glenties, alongside Lough Finn.

Routes

See also
 List of heritage railways in the Republic of Ireland
 List of narrow-gauge railways in Ireland

External links
Fintown Railway

References

3 ft gauge railways in Ireland
Heritage railways in the Republic of Ireland
Railway stations in County Donegal
Railway stations opened in 1903
Railway stations closed in 1947
Railway stations opened in 1995